Patricia Marie Gasso (née Froehlich; born May 27, 1962) is an American softball coach for the Oklahoma Sooners. She has been the head softball coach at the University of Oklahoma since 1995.

Early years
Born Patricia Marie Froehlich in Los Angeles, Gasso grew up in Torrance, California. She played softball at California State University, Long Beach.  She also coached softball at Long Beach City College from 1990 to 1994, compiling a record of 161–59–1.

Oklahoma
Her teams have advanced to the Women's College World Series fourteen times and won the national championship six times in 2000, 2013, 2016, 2017, 2021, and 2022. Her winning percentage of .802 ranks the highest of Division I college softball coaches with at least 1,000 career wins.

In 1999, the University of Oklahoma won its third Big 12 Conference championship in five years at Oklahoma, but financial difficulties nearly ended her tenure following the 1999 season.  Gasso noted:

Gasso remained in Oklahoma for the 2000 season despite her husband's return to California.  The 2000 University of Oklahoma team compiled a record of 66–8 and defeated UCLA three to one in the Women's College World Series to win the Sooners' first national softball championship.

Following the national championship in 2000, the University of Oklahoma gave Gasso "a significant salary hike," and her husband was able to return to Oklahoma.  Over the next 12 years, Gasso built the Sooners into a national softball power, winning over 40 games every year.  The 2001 team finished with a 50–9 record, and the 2007 team finished 55–8.

Gasso's 2012 team advanced to the finals of the Women's College World Series but lost the national championship in a close series against Alabama.  The 2012 team finished its season with a 54–10 record.  In late June 2012, the Oklahoma University Board of Regents extended Gasso's contract through the 2017 season.

Gasso was inducted into the National Fastpitch Coaches Association (NFCA) Hall of Fame in 2012.

Gasso reached a milestone on March 15, 2015 when she got her 1,000th win as the head coach of Oklahoma in a resounding win over East Carolina. 

On June 6, 2017, Gasso and the Sooner softball team swept Florida in the national championship, winning Gasso her second national championship in two years and fourth overall.

On June 10, 2021, Gasso and the Sooner softball team defeated Florida State in the national championship, winning Gasso her fifth overall. 

On June 8, 2022, Gasso's Sooners defeated the University of Texas to win the Women's College World Series, Gasso's and the school's sixth national softball championship.

Head coaching record
The following table lists Gasso's head coaching record at the NCAA level.

See also
List of college softball coaches with 1,000 wins

References

External links
 Oklahoma profile

1962 births
Living people
Female sports coaches
American softball coaches
El Camino Warriors softball players
Long Beach State Beach softball players
Long Beach City Vikings softball coaches
Oklahoma Sooners softball coaches
Sportspeople from Los Angeles
Sportspeople from Torrance, California
Softball players from California
Softball coaches from California
United States women's national softball team coaches